Îles de Los  are an island group lying off Conakry in Guinea, on the west coast of Africa. Their name is derived from the Portuguese: Ilhas dos Ídolos, "Islands of the Idols".

The islands are best known for their beaches and forested interiors and are popular with tourists. Ferries sail to the Los from Conakry.

Geography 
There are three main islands: Tamara (Fortoba), Kassa and Roume. Île de Corail, Île Blanche, Île Cabris, Île Poulet, Îlot Cabri and Îlot de la Bouteille are smaller islands and islets located in the southern half.

Tamara 
Tamara is home to the Île Tamara Lighthouse. The island used to have a prison.

Kassa 
Formerly known as Factory Island, the current name is derived from the Portuguese word "casa", meaning "house".

History 
The islands have been inhabited for a long time and rose to prominence for their role in the Atlantic slave trade. The Kaloum or Kalum dialect of the Baga language was originally spoken on the island by a group of Baga people.

In 1755, Miles Barber of the African Company of Liverpool established a trading post (then known as a factory) there employing workers skilled in ship repair as well as pilots for the local rivers. This led to Kassa being known as "Factory Island". English-language sources in the 18th century gave various corrupted names for the islands including "Isles of Loss", "the Edlesses", "The Idols", or "Las Idolas".

In 1812 Samuel Samo, a Dutch slave trader, was seized by the British there and taken to Freetown, Sierra Leone, where he appeared before the Vice Admiralty Court. He was the first person tried under the British Slave Trade Felony Act 1811. (See for context the 1818 Anglo-Dutch Slave Trade Treaty which established Mixed Commission Courts.)

British possession (1818–1904) 
Charles MacCarthy, the Governor of Sierra Leone, signed a treaty with Mangé Demba on 6 July 1818, whereby the islands were ceded to the British Empire for the payment of an annual rent. McCarthy then asked Peter Machlan, a surgeon with the 2nd West Indian Regiment to write an account of the islands and surrounding areas. This was published as Travels into the Baga and Soosoo country during the year 1821.

Part of French Guinea (1904–1958) 
Following a visit by Edward VII to France, and a return visit by the French President Émile Loubet, the French and British governments signed the Entente Cordiale on 7 April 1904: among many other matters, Îles de Los was handed over to France in exchange for France relinquishing fishing rights in Newfoundland. The islands were incorporated into French Guinea, one of the constituent parts of French West Africa, on July 1904. Scipio O'Connor was the first colonial administrator appointed by the French.

See also

References 

 

Conakry
Extinct volcanoes
Islands of Guinea
Landforms of Guinea
Volcanic islands
Archipelagoes of the Atlantic Ocean
Archipelagoes of Africa
Islands of the North Atlantic Ocean